Deepak Sharma (born November 30, 1946) is an Indian writer, best known for her short stories in Hindi and English. Between 1993 and 2021, she has published twenty one short stories. In 2021, she was awarded the Sahitya Bhushan Samman by the Uttar Pradesh Hindi Sansthan.

References 

1946 births
Living people
Indian writers